Lyces ena is a moth of the family Notodontidae first described by Jean Baptiste Boisduval in 1870. It is found from Panama to Brazil and Amazonian Peru, and also occurring on Trinidad.

External links
Species page at Tree of Life Web Project

Notodontidae
Moths described in 1870